Pietro Veneri (born 1964) is an Italian conductor, and professor of conducting at the Conservatorio Arrigo Boito in Parma.

He trained in piano and composition with Camillo Togni at the Conservatorio “Arrigo Boito” in Parma, where he graduated in conducting with Daniele Gatti.

During his career, he has conducted orchestras such as Tokyo City Philharmonic, Maggio Musicale Fiorentino, Sanremo Symphony, Osaka Century, Haydn Sinfonie-Orchester, Yamagata Symphony, Sinfonia Varsovia, Comunale of Bologna and Filarmonia Veneta, and in institutions such as Suntory Hall in Tokyo, the Konzerthaus, Vienna, Festival Hall, Osaka, Dalhalla Opera Festival, Teatro Regio of Parma, Teatro Comunale of Bologna, Nagoya Aichi Hall, Teatro del Maggio Musicale Fiorentino, Tokyo Orchard Hall and Auditorium della Conciliazione of Roma.
 
He has assisted Rafael Frühbeck de Burgos and collaborated with Zubin Mehta, Christian Thielemann, Riccardo Muti, Riccardo Chailly, Daniele Gatti and Georges Prêtre.

His students  have won many times the first prize and/or came in the finals of Conducting international competitions.

References

Italian male conductors (music)
Living people
1964 births
21st-century Italian conductors (music)
21st-century Italian male musicians